Arthur Sydney "Bill" Hendy (1912 - 9 September 1973) is a Canadian former cricketer. He was a left-handed batsman and a left-arm spin bowler. He played four first-class for Canada between 1951 and 1954, taking 10 wickets at an average of 22.20.

References
Cricket Archive profile
Cricinfo profile

1912 births
1973 deaths
Canadian cricketers
Barbadian emigrants to Canada